Fabrizio Capucci (born  4 August 1939) is an Italian former actor and producer.

Life and career 
Born in Rome, the brother of the fashion designer Roberto, Capucci studied acting at the drama school held by Pietro Sharoff in his hometown. After appearing in several supporting roles, he had his breakout with the role of Max in Florestano Vancini's The Warm Life. He was also active in a number of television miniseries and recorded some singles. 

After retiring from acting, Capucci started a career as a producer of commercials.  In 2004 he ran in the Lazio regional election for the Union of Democrats for Europe party, without being elected.  He was also president of the football team Viterbese for two years. 

Capucci was married to actress Catherine Spaak. They had a daughter, Sabrina.

Selected filmography 
 First Love (1959)
 Crazy Desire (1962)
 Eighteen in the Sun (1962)
 The Warm Life (1963)
 Highest Pressure (1965)
 Non son degno di te (1965)
 Rita the American Girl (1965)
 To Commit a Murder (1967)
 They Came to Rob Las Vegas (1968)
 Colt 38 Special Squad (1976)

References

External links 

 

1939 births
Male actors from Rome
Italian male film actors
Italian male television actors
Living people